Juan Díaz is a corregimiento in Antón District, Coclé Province, Panama. Its population as of 1990 was 1,694; its population as of 2000 was 2,037.

References

Corregimientos of Coclé Province